Henze Boekhout (born 1947 in Haarlem) is a Dutch artist/photographer who lives and works in Haarlem, the Netherlands.

Collections
His work is included in the collections of:
 the Stedelijk Museum, Amsterdam
Huis Marseille, Amsterdam,
the New York Public Library/ Spencer Collection, and 
the Fotomuseum, Rotterdam.

References

External links 
Boekhout's website

1947 births
Living people
Dutch photographers
Artists from Haarlem